The Berlin Wall (released as  in Japan) is a 1–2 player platform arcade video game released by Kaneko in 1991; two years after the fall of the actual Berlin Wall. A Game Gear version was also released exclusively in Japan; this version was going to be released in North America, but was canceled.

The player takes control of a young boy who must use his hammer to break the blocks that form part of the platform levels comprising each stage. These holes act as falling traps for the many patrolling, multi-coloured monsters and once one has fallen into a hole, the player may then use the hammer on the monster to make it fall through the hole and down to the platform below – causing it to transform into fruit or power-ups, which can then be collected and used. Part of the money earned from sales of the arcade version went towards a relief fund for disaster victims through the Japanese Red Cross Society.

The game bears a number of similarities to Space Panic, a game generally considered as the first platform video game.

References

External links
The Berlin Wall (Arcade) at Arcade History
The Berlin Wall (Arcade) at KLOV
The Berlin Wall (Game Gear) at GameFAQs
The Berlin Wall the Moby Games
The Berlin Wall (instruction manual) at The Gay Gamer

1991 video games
Arcade video games
Berlin Wall
Game Gear games
Kaneko games
Platform games
Video games developed in Japan
Multiplayer and single-player video games